Claudia Albertario (born May 16, 1977) is an Argentine model, vedette and actress of theatre, television and film. Her notable credits include Amigovios (1995), Como pan caliente (1996), Montaña rusa, otra vuelta (1997), Chiquititas (1997–1999), Gasoleros (1998 and 1999), and Verano del '98 (1998–2001). She also appeared on Dancing on Ice around the world.

Theatre 
 Actrices: 2020, Teatro 8, Miami, Florida, USA
 Histeriotipos: 2018, Teatro 8, Miami, FLorida, USA
 Bajo Terapia: 2016–2017, Teatro 8, Miami, Florida, USA
 Las Novias de Travolta: 2015, Teatro 8, Miami, Florida, USA
 Aquellas Cabareteras: 2014, micromusical, Miami, Florida, USA, Microteatro Centro Cultural Español.
 Fiestisima: 2012–2013, Music Hall Teatral Marplatence theater season, occupied the place where head company with Fernando Ramirez, Charly, Estela Ventura, Sebastian Pol, and Mariana Petraca.
 Barbierísima: 2011-2012: She was in Barbieri's theatre show Barbierísima alongside Bravísimas dancing vedettes, Andrea Estévez and Andrea Ghidone, the three being the leading vedettes in the musical. Also in the show were Carmen Barbieri, Zulma Faiad, Germán Krauss and Beto César as the biggest figures in the show. The musical holds over 40 figures.
 Shangay: 2011, Chacarerean theater presented a different work, written, acted, and directed by Jose Maria Muscari, one of the most eccentric directors; a contemporary black comedy. Cast: Jose Maria Muscari, Chunchuna Villafañe, Nicolas Pauls, Claudia Albertario and Eunice Castro.
 Pasion: 2009–2010, two successful seasons of a sitcom starring German Kraus, Dario Lopilato, Stella Maris Lanzani, and Claudia Albertario. Cast: Andrea Esteves and Luli Drosdek. Written by Sergio Marcos.
 Una Familia Poco Normal: 2008, a comedy of Gerardo Sofovich, Moria Casan starred alongside one of the greatest artists of the Argentina scene. Cast: Toti Ciliberto, Claudia Albertario, Moria Casan, Viviana Canosa, Miguel Jordan, Rolo Puente, Alvaro Navia and Juana Repetto.
 La Revista de San Luis: 2007, music hall. Cast: Gino Reni, Claudia ALbertario, and Marixa Balli.
 Mi tio es un travieso: 2006, Mariano Iudica, Candilejas Theater, Carlos Paz. Cast: Rolo Puente, Claudia Albertario, Mariano Iudica, Betina Capetillo, Victor Collino, and Tamara Paganini. Carlos Award for Best Comedy Actress.
 El Pintor: 2005, comedy with wit by Donald Churchill. Starring Alberto Martin, Claudia Albertario and Carolina Papaleo. Directed by Carlos Evaristo.
 La Sirenita: 2005, children's musical, national tour. Claudia Albertatio.
 El fondo puede esperar: 2004, national tour, music hall. Cast: Nito Artaza, Claudia Albertario, and Maria Eugenia Rito.
 Vengo por el aviso: 2004, written by Marc Camoletti. Cast: Norma Pons, Rodolfo Ranni, Maria Fernanda Callejon, Claudia Albertario, Campi, Claudio Morgado, Laura Cymer and Eduardo Carrera. Theater Astral and National Tour. Directed by Carlos Evaristo.
 La corte suprema de la risa: 2003, Carlos Paz. Cast: Tristan, Yanina Zilly, Claudia Albertario, and Juan Acosta. Written by Camblor.
 Atrapados por la risa: 2002, music hall, choreography by Flavio Mendoza. Cast: Sergio Gonal, Claudia Albertario, Juan Acosta, and Flavio Mendoza. Theater Carreras, Mar del Plata.

Television 
Albertario is currently participating in the reality diving competition Celebrity Splash!.

 Inconquistable corazón (1994)
 Amigovios (1995)
 Como pan caliente (1996)
 Montaña rusa, otra vuelta (1997)
 Ricos y famosos (1997-1998)
 Chiquititas (1997-1999)
 Gasoleros (1998-1999)
 Muñeca brava (1998-1999)
 Verano del '98 (1998-2001)
 Teleshow internacional (2000)
 Primicias (2000)
 El show creativo (2000)
 Delirium Tremens (2000)
 La movida del verano (2000)
 Fiesta de la Reina del Mar (2000)
 Poné a Francella (2001 - 2002)
 Franstrack (2003)
 Los machos (2004)
 Pensionados (2004)
 La niñera (2004)
 Los Roldán (2005)
 Casados con hijos (2005-2006)
 Quien es el jefe (2005)
 Decisiones (United States) (2006)
 Amas de casa desesperadas (Mexico) (2007)
 Amor mío (Mexico) (2007)
 No hay dos sin tres (2007)
 Bailando por un sueño (2007)
 Patinando por un sueño (2007)
 Socias (2008)
 Valentino el argentino (2008)
 Patinando por un sueño (2008)
 Cantando por un sueño (2012)
 Intrusos en la televisión (Chile) (2012)
 En portada (Chile) (2012)
 Alfombra roja (Chile) (2012)
 Sin Dios ni late (Chile) (2012)
 Celebrity Splash (2013)
 Sres. Papis (2014)
  Eva La Trailera (2016), Telemundo, Miami, USA

References

External links
 
 Official site

1977 births
Living people
Actresses from Buenos Aires
Argentine female models
Argentine film actresses
Argentine stage actresses
Argentine entertainers
Burlesque performers
Argentine vedettes
Argentine musical theatre actresses
Argentine musical theatre producers
20th-century Argentine actresses
21st-century Argentine actresses
Singers from Buenos Aires
The Challenge (TV series) contestants